Abdullah Khan may refer to:

Sport
 Abdullah Khan (athlete) (born 1933), Pakistani Olympic sprinter
 Abdullah Khan (cricketer) (born 1965), Pakistani cricketer

Government, military, and politics
 Abdullah Khan II (1533–1598), sixteenth century Uzbek ruler
 Abdullah Khan (Moghul Khan) (died 1675), one of the last Chagatai Khans at Khotan
 Abdullah Azam Khan (born 1993), Indian politician

Other
 Abdullah Mohammad Khan, Afghan former Guantanamo detainee
 Abdullah Khan (Guantanamo detainee 950), Afghan detainee at Guantanamo Bay